Akbar Nikzad (born 1969 in Ardabil) is an Iranian politician, and the Governor of Ardabil Province and Kohgiluyeh and Boyer-Ahmad Province from 2011 to 2013 in the Government of Mahmoud Ahmadinejad. He was former mayor of Hometown Ardabil. Ali Nikzad his brother was former minister of Ahmadinejad Government. He is the head of Housing Foundation of Islamic Revolution since 2021.

References

1969 births
People from Ardabil
Living people
Governors of Ardabil Province
Governors of Kohgiluyeh and Boyer-Ahmad Province
Mayors of Ardabil